USS Eberle (DD-430) was a  of the United States Navy.  The ship is named for Rear Admiral Edward Walter Eberle, who commanded the Atlantic and Pacific Fleets and was Chief of Naval Operations from 1923 to 1927. The destroyer entered service in 1940 and spent the majority of her career in the Atlantic Ocean. Placed in reserve following the war, the ship was transferred to the Hellenic Navy in 1951. Renamed Niki, the destroyer remained in service until 1972 when she was scrapped.

Construction and career
Eberle was launched on 14 September 1940 by Bath Iron Works Corp., Bath, Maine; sponsored by Miss Mildred Eberle, granddaughter of Rear Admiral Eberle. The ship was commissioned on 4 December 1940.

After training in the Caribbean and along the East Coast, Eberle was assigned to patrol duty off Bermuda until the end of August 1941, when she began to escort convoys to Newfoundland, Iceland and far northern bases. She guarded the vital western Atlantic end of the lifeline to Britain before and after the US entry into the war. Once she reached Scotland. Returning to Norfolk, Virginia on 23 August 1942, she sailed two days later, escorting tankers by way of Galveston to Cristóbal and another convoy from Trinidad to Belém, and back to Norfolk 8 October.

Eberle sortied from Norfolk 25 October 1942 for the invasion of North Africa, and gave bombardment and fire support for the landings at Mehedia, French Morocco on 8 November. Returning to Norfolk on 27 November, she sailed on 26 December for South Atlantic patrol, based on Recife, Brazil. On 10 March 1943 she intercepted the German blockade runner Karin. When Eberle boarded, demolition charges set by the Germans exploded, killing half the 14-man boarding party outright. The remaining seven persisted in their efforts to save Karin and obtain information until fire and further explosions forced them to abandon ship. They and 72 prisoners were picked up from the water by Eberle.

After overhaul at Charleston, Eberle returned to escort duty, making five voyages to north African ports between 13 April 1943 and 31 January 1944. She returned to Oran on 22 February and after amphibious training, arrived at Naples on 11 March, her base for patrol and bombardment until May. On 20 April she broke up an attack by German E-boats on the transport anchorage — sinking one and damaging three others so badly that they were subsequently beached.

Eberle continued patrol and escort duty in the Mediterranean, then sailed from Malta 13 August 1944 for the invasion of southern France (15 August), where she saw action. On 21 August she bombarded Île de Porquerolles until a white flag was seen. A landing force took 58 prisoners of war whose escape boats had been destroyed by Eberles fire, 14 more Germans surrendered the following day.

Returning to New York on 6 November 1944, Eberle escorted two convoys to Oran by April 1945. After overhaul and training she sailed from New York 8 June for the Pacific, arriving at Pearl Harbor on 20 July to join the aircraft carrier  for plane guard duty. She departed on 1 November for Alaskan waters and called at Petropavlovsk, in Russian Kamchatka, from 1 to 5 December, before returning to Pearl Harbor on 15 December.

Convoys escorted

Post World War II service
Eberle left Pearl Harbor 6 January 1946 and reached Charleston, South Carolina, 8 February. She was placed out of commission in reserve there 3 June 1946. On 12 August she was assigned to the Naval Reserve Training program in the 3rd Naval District. After being towed to New York in September, she was placed "in-service" 13 January 1947 and carried Naval Reservists on cruises to Canada, the Caribbean, and Bermuda. During this time she was placed in commission in reserve 19 May 1950 and in full commission 21 November 1950.

Disposal and Greek service

Eberle arrived at Boston 21 January 1951, was decommissioned the following day and transferred to Greece under the Mutual Defense Assistance Program. She served in the Greek navy as Niki until she was stricken and scrapped in 1972.

Eberle received three battle stars for World War II service.

References

External links 

      history.navy.mil: USS Eberle
   navsource.org: USS Eberle
   hazegray.org: USS Eberle

 

Gleaves-class destroyers of the United States Navy
Ships built in Bath, Maine
1940 ships
World War II destroyers of the United States
Gleaves-class destroyers of the Hellenic Navy